Dina Feitelson, also known as Dina Feitelson-Schur (born 1926; died 1992), was an Israeli educator and scholar in the field of reading acquisition.

Biography
Dina Schur was born in 1926 in Vienna, and emigrated to Mandate Palestine in 1934.
She studied in the Herzliya Hebrew Gymnasium in the 32nd class, which graduated in 1944.

After graduating she studied philosophy in the Hebrew University of Jerusalem. Her studies were interrupted by 1948 Arab–Israeli War. During the war she suffered a severe head injury.

After graduating she worked as an elementary school teacher and later as an inspector for the Ministry of Education.
In parallel she also embarked upon an academic career, initially in the Hebrew University of Jerusalem. Then, in 1973, she accepted a post at the University of Haifa, where she became a professor of Education. She continued to work there till her death in 1992.

Awards and recognition
In 1953, Feitelson was awarded the Israel Prize, in its inaugural year, in the field of education for her work on causes of failure in first grade children. She was the first woman to receive this prize, and also the youngest recipient ever (she was aged 27).

Shortly before her death, Feitelson was inducted to the International Reading Association's Reading Hall of Fame.

In 1997, the International Reading Association established the Dina Feitelson Research Award, to honour the memory of Dina Feitelson by recognizing an outstanding empirical study published in English in a referred journal. The work should report on one or more aspects of literacy acquisition, such as phonemic awareness, the alphabetic principle, bilingualism, or cross-cultural studies of beginning reading.

Published works

See also
 List of Israel Prize recipients
 List of Austrian Jews

References

Further reading

External links
Research Prize by the International Literacy Association (previously the International Reading Association) in honour of Dina Feitelson
Judges Rationale for Award of Israel Prize (in Hebrew) on University of Haifa Faculty website

Austrian emigrants to Mandatory Palestine
Austrian Jews
Austrian educators
Austrian women educators
Hebrew University of Jerusalem alumni
Israel Prize in education recipients
Israel Prize women recipients
20th-century Israeli Jews
Israeli people wounded in the 1947–1949 Palestine war
Israeli educators
Israeli women educators
Jewish educators
Jews in Mandatory Palestine
Academic staff of the University of Haifa
1926 births
1992 deaths
Israeli female military personnel